Arkadia, or Arcadia, is a region of Greece.

Arkadia may also refer to:

Places
 Arkadia (Crete), a town and city-state of ancient Crete, Greece
 Arkadia, Łowicz County in Łódź Voivodeship (central Poland), with the English Garden Park 
 Arkadía, older name of Kyparissia, Greece
 Arkadia hill (Arkadianmäki), location of the Parliament House, Helsinki and a metonym for the Parliament of Finland
 Arkadia (shopping mall), a shopping mall in Warsaw, Poland
 Arkadia, a large shopping center situated on the island on Gozo, in the Maltese archipelago

Art and entertainment
 "Arkadia", a song by Babymetal from the album Metal Galaxy
 Arkadia, a fictional walled settlement built by the Skaikru, in The 100 TV series
 Arkadia Records, an American record label
 Spartakus and the Sun Beneath the Sea, a French animated series, known in some countries as Arkadia

 Arkadia, a fictional planet in an episode of Space: 1999 (TV series).

See also
 Arcadia (disambiguation)